Harald Eugen Øveraas (16 July 1927 – 9 February 2014) was a Norwegian trade unionist.

He hailed from Velfjord. He started working on the Nordland Line at the age of 15, and later worked in mines at Svalbard, Malm and Løkken Verk. His first trade union post came in 1946 at Svalbard. He also worked at two construction sites as well as prison guard.

In 1966 he was hired as an information secretary in the Norwegian Union of General Workers. He was later elected as vice chairman in 1979, advancing to chairman in 1981 after the death of chairman Ole Flesvig. He served until 1991, and then chaired the Norwegian People's Aid for the next eight years.

He was a member of the Communist Party of Norway. He died in February 2014.

References

1927 births
2014 deaths
People from Brønnøy
Communist Party of Norway politicians
Norwegian trade unionists